The Battle of the Gulf was a naval battle on 25 June 1244 in Iceland's Húnaflói Bay, during the Age of the Sturlungs civil war. The conflicting parties were the followers of Þórður kakali Sighvatsson and those of Kolbeinn ungi Arnórsson. Þórður's men were from the Westfjords of Iceland, while Kolbeinn's were northerners. The primary weapons were rocks hurled between boats. A detailed description of the battle can be found in Sturlunga saga.

References
Jón Jóhannesson, Magnús Finnbogason and Kristján Eldjárn (eds.) Sturlunga Saga, Vol 1 & 2, Sturlunguútgáfan, Reykjavík - 1946

1244 in Europe
Battle of Orlygsstadir
the Gulf
the Gulf